Joël Scherk (27 May 1946 – 16 May 1980) was a French theoretical physicist who studied string theory and supergravity.

Work
Scherk studied in Paris at the École Normale Supérieure (ENS).

In 1974, together with John H. Schwarz, Scherk realised that string theory was a theory of quantum gravity. In 1978, together with Eugène Cremmer and Bernard Julia, Scherk constructed the Lagrangian and supersymmetry transformations for supergravity in eleven dimensions, which is one of the foundations of M-theory.

He died unexpectedly, and in tragic circumstances, months after the supergravity workshop at the State University of New York at Stony Brook that was held on 27–29 September 1979. The workshop proceedings were dedicated to his memory, with a statement that Scherk, a diabetic, had been trapped somewhere without his insulin and went into a diabetic coma. Two decades later, in his 2001 novel Euclid's Window, author and theoretical physicist Leonard Mlodinow credited Schwarz and Scherk for their "astounding discovery" that gravity was part of string theory in a way that would "avoid contradictions between general relativity and quantum mechanics", but noted that Scherk suffered a breakdown, his wife left with their children, and he later committed suicide.

The high-energy theory library of the Laboratoire de Physique Théorique at École Normale Supérieure (Paris) is dedicated in his honor. A conference in Paris, on 16–20 October 2006, celebrating 30 years of supergravity, was dedicated to Scherk.

See also
 GSO projection

References 

1946 births
1980 deaths
French string theorists
1980 suicides